Pat Cubellis (born 7 February 1967) is a Canadian former soccer player who earned four caps for the national team in 1986. 

In 1986, he played in the National Soccer League with Panhellenic Olympics. In 1987, he played for North York Rockets. In 1990, he played for London Lasers. In late 1990, he returned to his former team Panhellenic Olympics.

References

External links
 
 
 
 

1967 births
Living people
Canada men's international soccer players
Canadian soccer players
Soccer players from Toronto
University of Toronto alumni
Canada men's youth international soccer players
North York Rockets players
London Lasers players
Canadian National Soccer League players
Canadian Soccer League (1987–1992) players
Association football forwards